HMS E44 was a British E class submarine built by Swan Hunter, Wallsend. She was laid down on 8 January 1916 and was commissioned on 18 July 1916. E44 was sold for scrap in South Wales on 13 October 1921.

Design
She was powered by two  Vickers eight-cylinder two-stroke diesel engines and two  electric motors.

E44 was armed with a 12-pounder  QF gun mounted forward of the conning tower. She had five 18 inch (450 mm) torpedo tubes, two in the bow, one either side amidships, and one in the stern; a total of 10 torpedoes were carried.

E-Class submarines had wireless systems with  power ratings; in some submarines, these were later upgraded to  systems by removing a midship torpedo tube. Their maximum design depth was  although in service some reached depths of below . Some submarines contained Fessenden oscillator systems.

References

Bibliography
 

 

British E-class submarines of the Royal Navy
Ships built on the River Tyne
1916 ships
World War I submarines of the United Kingdom
Royal Navy ship names
Ships built by Swan Hunter